Antoni Morell Mora (14 December 1941 – 5 January 2020) was a Spanish-born Andorran diplomat, civil servant, writer and lawyer.

Career
From 1972 to 1973 he was appointed Pedagogical advisor of the General Council with Lídia Armengol i Vila. From then until 1981 he was Secretary of Sindicatura General, then from 1981 to 1984 he was General Secretary of the First Andorran Government. From 1984 to 2004 he privately practiced as a lawyer. From  to  he was ambassador of the Principality of Andorra to the Holy See. 

He regularly collaborated with several magazines and was President of the Association of Writers of the Principality. He wrote numerous essays on sociology, geography, history and legal disciplines. He won several national and international awards for his literary activities.

Personal life
Mora was born in Barcelona to a Spaniard taxi driver from Alpicat (Lerida) and a housekeeper who was an heiress in Andorra. The family later moved from Spain to Andorra. He also had an older sibling, Montserrat Morell Mora. Mora attended Conciliar Seminary of Barcelona for seminary studies but was not ordained as deacon. He went on to study history at Universidad de Zaragoza (1969) and law at Universitat de Barcelona (1976).

References

1941 births
2020 deaths
Ambassadors of Andorra to the Holy See
University of Zaragoza alumni
University of Barcelona alumni
Andorran diplomats
Andorran writers
Andorran lawyers